Hayes High School may refer to:  

 Carol W. Hayes High School, Birmingham, Alabama
 Cardinal Hayes High School, New York City (Bronx)
 Rutherford B. Hayes High School, Delaware, Ohio
 Max S. Hayes High School, Cleveland, Ohio
 Leo Hayes High School, Fredericton, New Brunswick, Canada